Ukrainian Fashion Week (Ukrainian: Український Тиждень Моди) is the first pret-a-porter week in Eastern Europe.

History 
Ukrainian Fashion Week was founded in 1997 and became the first prêt-à-porter week in Eastern Europe.

This is a unique event in Ukraine, which follows the world standards of prêt-a-porter shows It is held twice a year, gathers more than 50 participants, accredits more than 200 Ukrainian and foreign media and is visited by more than 15,000 guests each time.

The first season took place in November 1997 in Kyiv. Until 2005 the event had 2 names — Ukrainian Fashion Week and Pret-a-porter Fashion Seasons Week. At the end of 2005, the organizing committee officially informed the designers and the press about the use of only Ukrainian Fashion Week.

Since January 2006, the co-founders of Ukrainian Fashion Week are Iryna Danylevska and Oleksandr Sokolovskyi.

Main designers 
There are several resident designers of Ukrainian Fashion Week:

 ARTEM KLIMCHUK
 BEVZA
 Elena BURENINA
 FINCH
 FROLOV
 GASANOVA
 KSENIA SCHNAIDER
 Litkovskaya
 POUSTOVIT
 Ruslan Baginskiy
 the COAT by Katya Silchenko
 THEO
 ELENA BURENINA
 ROUSSIN
 ARUTIUNOVA
 VOROZHBYT&ZEMSKOVA
 DARJA DONEZZ
 DZHUS and others

Projects 
In 2003, the New Names and Fresh Fashion projects were launched. They aimed to find and support talented young people as part of Ukrainian Fashion Week. These projects helped to increase a number of new people in Ukrainian fashion and gave for UFW the reputation of a discoverer of young talents.

Since 2014, Ukrainian Fashion Week has united the shows of the participants of these projects, creating New Generation Day — a separate day dedicated to young designers in the official UFW program.

Every year many projects take place under the auspices of Ukrainian Fashion Week: Best Fashion Awards (First Ukrainian Fashion Prize since 2010), Holiday Fashion Week (shows of cruise collections and beach accessories are held in Odesa from 2007 to 2018), All-Ukrainian competition of young fashion designers Look into the future (since 2000), Fashion Film Festival Kyiv (since 2018).

Ukrainian Fashion Week hosts international fashion projects: world-renowned designers Elie Saab (2009) and Stephane Rolland (2010) presented the Haute couture collection in Kyiv as part of the UFW collection. In 2011, Antonio Berardi presented his collection during Ukrainian Fashion Week, and in March 2012 a project Eurofashion brought together designers from 16 countries participating in EURO-2012.

In 2018, the International Young Designers Contest was held in Ukraine for the first time, it was initiated by Ukrainian Fashion Week. The competition was attended by 16 designers from nine countries: Georgia, Estonia, Lithuania, Moldova, Poland, Slovakia, Hungary, Ukraine and the Czech Republic. The competition in Kyiv once again confirmed Ukraine's leadership in the field of fashion in the regions of Eastern and Central Europe.

In the fall of 2018, in New York City during New York Fashion Week and in Tokyo during Amazon Tokyo Fashion Week, the UFW organizing committee presented the FASHION EXPERIMENT 01 project. During the presentation, American, Japanese and European fashion journalists, influencers, bloggers, buyers and photographers were able to see UFW residents with SS19 collections: bobkova., DZHUS, FROLOV, Ruslan Baginskiy, the COAT by Katya Silchenko, Valery Kovalska, Yelizavetta Volosovska.

International media 
The Organizing Committee of the Fashion Week every season invites journalists and photographers of the world's leading publications, buyers and representatives of the leading showrooms to Kyiv to work directly with the designers-participants of UFW.

Names and titles of Ukrainian designers regularly appear in such fashion publications as Business of Fashion, Vogue.com, Vogue Italia, Vogue France, Buro 24 / 7.ru, ELLE , Another Magazine, VICE, Daily Mail and others.

Guests of Ukrainian Fashion Week are photographed by street style photographers such as Adam Katz Sinding, Vogue.com, Highsnobiety and others.

In 2015, the organizing committee of Ukrainian Fashion Week initiated the participation of Ukrainian designers in the International Fashion Showcase project as part of London Fashion Week. British alternative fashion editions Dazed and Confused and I-D Magazine wrote about the project and the designers who took part in it.

External links 
 Official website

References 

Annual events in Ukraine
Ukrainian fashion
Recurring events established in 1997
1997 establishments in Ukraine
Fashion weeks